Simon Aspelin and Todd Perry were the defending champions, but lost in the semifinals this year.

Chris Haggard and Ivo Karlović won in the final 0–6, 7–5, [10–5], against James Blake and Mardy Fish.

Seeds

Draw

Draw

External links
Draw

2006 Regions Morgan Keegan Championships and the Cellular South Cup
2006 ATP Tour